Dr. Philip C. Mead, an American historian specializing in the period of the American Revolution, is Chief Historian and Curator of the Museum of the American Revolution in Philadelphia.

Mead served as an advising historian for exhibition developlment beginning in 2011, and became historian and curator in 2014. He co-curated the Museum's award-winning core exhibition, and helped to shape the media experiences and public programs. He then led the collections and exhibitions team through five special exhibitions, including most recently, When Women Lost the Vote: A Revolutionary Story, 1776-1807, which broke new ground by identifying the names of large numbers of women voters in early New Jersey.

Mead earned a doctorate in American history from Harvard University in 2012.  Mead's doctoral dissertation, Melancholy Landscapes: Writing Warfare in the American Revolution, was written under Jill Lepore and draws on the diaries of 169 Revolutionary Army soldiers. Mead previously served as a lecturer at Harvard University from 2012-2014.

In 2017, Mead discovered the only known period image of General George Washington's Revolutionary War tent in the field. In 2019, he was part of the team that discovered poll lists featuring the names of women and Black men who voted in New Jersey in the years following the Revolutionary War.

References

Living people
21st-century American historians
21st-century American male writers
Harvard University alumni
Harvard University faculty
Year of birth missing (living people)
American male non-fiction writers